Oxford Grammar High School (OGHS) is a private school in Hyderabad, Telangana, India, run by Vikas Educational Academy and affiliated to Central Board of Secondary Education (CBSE).

History
Oxford Grammar High School was founded by educationalist Manikonda Vedakumar, an alumnus of the JNTU, Hyderabad, in the year 1980. In 2008, its management started a Central Board of Secondary Education (CBSE) affiliated school as well.  The total strength of the school is around 900 with 42 teachers teaching at their level best. It is located at St.No.13, HimayatNagar, Hyderabad, Telangana.

Mission

The school's aim is to provide each child with well-thought-out opportunities to develop his/her potential within a nurturing and safe environment. It does this through positive reinforcement and modeling. This contributes to a curriculum which fosters a sense of awe and wonder, inspiring children to start their learning journey with a strong sense that learning is a lifelong enjoyable endeavor.

Cultural and sports activities
Cultural activities and sports activities are celebrated every other year giving emphasis to both cultural activities and sports respectively. Every child is unique, hence he is given a chance to participate in sports and in cultural events, thereby giving them overall development. Apart from this, the above-mentioned school is also associated with Sports Gurukul- the physical education specialists. The crew is all well trained with a B.P.T degree thereby guiding them to the utmost extent. All the classrooms are well equipped with the DigiBoards for the children to visualize the topics for the clear understanding of the children.

Amoeba Education

Amoeba Education is the curriculum supporter to the school, guiding the teachers in their lesson plans and various workshops on different aspects like gender sensitivity, classroom management, etc. The Amoeba Education is empaneled with CBSE where workshops are valid thereby empowering the efficiency and confidence level of the teachers. The school was rated ‘The Gold School’ by an independent body called the ‘Grey Matters’ assessed the teachers and students. They conducted the academic audit and the school won their ‘Gold School’ award.

See also
Education in India
List of schools in India

References

External links 
Official Website

Private schools in Hyderabad, India
1980 establishments in Andhra Pradesh
Educational institutions established in 1980